Georges Benoît (27 November 1883 – 1942) was a French cinematographer who worked on more than sixty films during his career. During the silent era, he was employed mostly in Hollywood. Later he worked in his native France on films such as Jacques Tourneur's Departure (1931). Between 1929 and 1934 he appeared in approximately ten films as an actor.

Benoît also worked in Argentina where he directed the 1919 film Juan Sin Ropa and was cinematographer for the historical epic The Charge of the Gauchos (1928).

Selected filmography

 Regeneration (1915)
 Carmen (1915)
 The Serpent (1916)
 Blue Blood and Red (1916)
 When False Tongues Speak (1917)
 The Wonder Man (1920)
 The Stealers (1920)
 The Little 'Fraid Lady (1920)
 What's a Wife Worth? (1921)
 Live and Let Live (1921)
 Omar the Tentmaker (1922)
 Wandering Daughters (1923)
 Trilby (1923)
 Welcome Stranger (1924) (as George Benoit)
 Why Get Married? (1924)
 Off the Highway (1925)
 Stop Flirting (1925)
 A Lover's Oath (1925)
 The Prairie Pirate (1925)
 The Danger Girl (1926)
 West of Broadway (1926)
 Pals in Paradise (1926)
 The Speeding Venus (1926)
 Forbidden Waters (1926)
 The Danger Girl (1926)
 No Control (1927)
 The Wagon Show (1928)
 The Charge of the Gauchos (1928)
 Captain Fracasse (1929)
 Departure (1931)
 In the Name of the Law (1932)
 The Two Orphans (1933)
 The Uncle from Peking (1934)
 Return to Paradise (1935)
 The Secret of Polichinelle (1936)
 Let's Make a Dream (1936)
 My Father Was Right (1936)
 The Baker's Wife (1938)

References

Bibliography 
 Finkielman, Jorge. The Film Industry in Argentina: An Illustrated Cultural History. McFarland, 2003.
 Fujiwara, Chris. Jacques Tourneur: The Cinema of Nightfall. McFarland, 1998.

External links 
 

1883 births
1942 deaths
French cinematographers
French male film actors
French male silent film actors
20th-century French male actors
Film directors from Paris